Frederick Augustus II (16 November 1852 in Oldenburg – 24 February 1931 in Rastede) was the last ruling Grand Duke of Oldenburg. He married Princess Elisabeth Anna of Prussia, daughter of Princess Maria Anna of Anhalt-Dessau and Prince Frederick Charles of Prussia. After her death, he married Elisabeth Alexandrine of Mecklenburg-Schwerin.

Reign 
Frederick Augustus' reign began on 13 June 1900, when his father died. His reign came to an end on 11 November 1918, shortly before the German monarchy was abolished on 28 November 1918.

Frederick was forced to abdicate his throne at the end of World War I, when the former Grand Duchy of the German Empire joined the post-war German Republic. He and his family took up residence at Rastede Castle, where he took up farming and local industrial interests. A year after his abdication, he asked the Oldenburg Diet for a yearly allowance of 150,000 marks, stating that his financial condition was "extremely precarious".

In 1931, Frederick died in Rastede.

Marriages and issue 
On 18 February 1878, Frederick Augustus married Princess Elisabeth Anna of Prussia, a daughter of Prince Frederick Charles of Prussia. It was a double wedding, in which Princess Charlotte of Prussia (daughter of the Crown Prince and Crown Princess of Prussia) married Bernhard, Hereditary Prince of Saxe-Meiningen on the same day as Elisabeth Anna in Berlin. The marriages were the first such occasions performed since Prussia had become the German Empire in 1870. Due to this increased status, the weddings were attended by many important personages, including King Leopold II of Belgium and his wife Queen Marie Henriette. The Prince of Wales also attended, as one of the brides (Charlotte) was his niece.

Frederick Augustus and Elisabeth Anna had two children:

Elisabeth died on 28 August 1895, before he succeeded as Grand Duke. Before her death, her husband had been building a new residential palace; once she died, Frederick named the new building the Elisabeth-Anna-Palais in her honor.

On 24 October 1896, Frederick Augustus married Duchess Elisabeth Alexandrine of Mecklenburg-Schwerin, a daughter of Frederick Francis II, Grand Duke of Mecklenburg. He succeeded as Grand Duke of Oldenburg in 1900.

Frederick Augustus and Elisabeth had five children:

Honours

Ancestry

References

Bibliography

|-

1852 births
1931 deaths
Grand Dukes of Oldenburg
People from Oldenburg (city)
Admirals of the Imperial German Navy
Generals of Cavalry (Prussia)
Grand Crosses of the Order of Saint Stephen of Hungary
Honorary Knights Grand Cross of the Royal Victorian Order
Burials at the Ducal Mausoleum, Gertrudenfriedhof (Oldenburg)